Mart Ojavee (born 9 November 1981 in Tallinn) is an Estonian cyclist.

Major results

2007
 1st Stages 1 & 4 An Post Rás
 1st Stage 7 Tour of Bulgaria
 3rd Scandinavian Open Road Race
2008
 1st Stage 1 Five Rings of Moscow
 1st Tallinn–Tartu GP
 1st Stage 4 Way to Pekin
 3rd Memoriał Henryka Łasaka
 7th SEB Tartu Grand Prix
2009
 1st Grand Prix of Donetsk
 5th National Road Race Championships
2010
 4th National Road Race Championships
2011
 1st  National Road Race Championships
 1st Overall Saaremaa Velotuur
1st Stage 1 (TTT)
 3rd National Time Trial Championships
2012
 1st Overall Saaremaa Velotuur
1st Stage 1 (TTT)
 4th National Road Race Championships
2013
 4th National Time Trial Championships

References

1981 births
Living people
Estonian male cyclists
Sportspeople from Tallinn